Kaj Oskar Chydenius (born 16 October 1939, Kuusankoski) is a Finnish composer, probably best known for his left-wing political songs interpreted by various artists.

Chydenius studied at the Sibelius Academy, the University of Helsinki and the Helsinki School of Economics, starting his career with avant-garde music, happening, instrumental theatre, and the aesthetics of John Cage. Some of the best-known works by Chydenius are Lapualaisooppera (1966) and such songs as 'Sinua, sinua rakastan', 'Nuoruustango' and the children's song 'Magdaleena', which are all evergreens in Finland. Kaj Chydenius was one of the founding members of KOM-teatteri in 1971, together with Kaisa Korhonen who was his wife then. The younger son of Kaj Chydenius, Jussi Chydenius is a member of the vocal ensemble Rajaton. Many works by Chydenius are released on Love Records.

Kaj Chydenius is related to Anders Chydenius (1729–1803), a Finnish Lutheran priest and a member of the Swedish Riksdag; this was his great-great-uncle in the fifth generation.

Selected discography
Lauluja (1966)
Kauneimmat rakkauslaulut (1977)
Unet palaavat Helsinkiin (1996)

References 

1939 births
Living people
People from Kuusankoski
Finnish composers
Finnish male composers